Blacks Sands may refer to the following:

 Black Sands (album), an album by Bonobo
 Black Sands, a novel by Colleen Coble
 Black Sands, Hawaii, a community in Hawaii
 Black Sands (TV series), an Icelandic television series

See also

 Black Sands Entertainment